Kira Carstensen is a documentary film maker.

On January 24, 2012, she was nominated for an Academy Award for the film The Tsunami and the Cherry Blossom.

References

External links

Living people
American documentary film producers
Year of birth missing (living people)
Place of birth missing (living people)